Gada Meilin is a 2002 film directed by Chinese director Feng Xiaoning. It deals with the story of Inner Mongolian hero Gada Meiren, who led a failed rebellion at the beginning of the 1930s against dispossession of Mongol banner lands by Zhang Zuolin and Zhang Xueliang.

Cast
Deligeer		
Ebusi		
Hu Xiaoguang		
Li Ming		
Liu Wei as Mu Dan
Tu Men

External links 
 
 

2002 films
2002 drama films
Films set in the 1930s
Films directed by Feng Xiaoning
Chinese drama films
2000s Chinese films